Nikola Stanković (born 24 April 2003) is a Serbian footballer who currently plays as a midfielder for Napredak Kruševac, on loan from Red Star Belgrade.

Career statistics

Club

Honours

Club
Red Star Belgrade
 Serbian SuperLiga: 2021–22
 Serbian Cup: 2021–22

References

2003 births
Living people
Serbian footballers
Serbia youth international footballers
Association football midfielders
Serbian First League players
Red Star Belgrade footballers
RFK Grafičar Beograd players
Serbian SuperLiga players
Serbia under-21 international footballers